A gord is a medieval Slavonic fortified settlement, usually built on strategic sites such as hilltops, riverbanks, lake islets or peninsulas between the 6th and 12th centuries CE in Central and Eastern Europe. The typical gord usually consisted of a group of wooden houses surrounded by a wall made of earth and wood, and a palisade running along the top of the bulwark.

Etymology 

The term ultimately descends from the reconstructed Proto-Indo-European root ǵʰortós, enclosure. The Proto-Slavic word *gordъ later differentiated into grad (Cyrillic: град), gorod (Cyrillic: город), gród in Polish, gard in Kashubian, etc. It is the root of various words in modern Slavic languages pertaining to fences and fenced-in areas (Belarusian гарадзіць, Ukrainian horodyty, Czech ohradit, Russian ogradit, Serbo-Croatian ograditi, and Polish ogradzać, grodzić, to fence off). It also has evolved into words for a garden in certain languages.

Additionally, it has furnished numerous modern Slavic words for a city or town:

Polish gród, plural grody (toponymic; nowadays a town or city is termed miasto, but remnants of a gród are known as grodzisko)
Ancient Pomeranian and modern Kashubian gard
Slovak and Czech hrad ("castle" in the modern language), or hradisko/hradiště/hradec, which are terms for gord
Slovene grad ("castle" in modern Slovene)
Belarusian горад (horad)
Russian город (gorod)
Ukrainian город (horod, dialectal and toponymic; nowadays misto)
Bulgarian, Serbo-Croatian, and Macedonian grad/град

The names of many Central and Eastern European cities harken back to their pasts as gords. Some of them are in countries which once were but no longer are mainly inhabited by Slavic-speaking peoples. 

Examples include:
 Horodok
 Gorod (toponymy)
 Hrod (toponymy)
 Hrud
 Horod
 Hrad (toponymy)
 Gard (Slavic toponymy)
 Grod (toponymy)
 Grad (toponymy)

The words in Polish and Slovak for suburbium, podgrodzie and podhradie correspondingly, literally mean a settlement beneath a gord: the gród/hrad was frequently built at the top of a hill, and the podgrodzie/podhradie at its foot. (The Slavic prefix pod-, meaning "under/below" and descending from the Proto-Indo-European root pṓds, meaning foot, being equivalent to Latin sub-). The word survives in the names of several villages (Podgrodzie, Subcarpathian Voivodeship) and town districts (e.g., that of Olsztyn), as well as in the names of the German municipalities Puttgarden, Wagria and Putgarten, Rügen.

From this same Proto-Indo-European root come the Germanic word elements *gard and *gart (as in Stuttgart), and likely also the names of Graz, Austria and Gartz, Germany. Cognate to these are English words such as garden, yard, garth, girdle and court. Also cognate but less closely related are Latin hortus, a garden, and its English descendants horticulture and orchard. In Hungarian, kert, the word for a garden, literally means encircled. Because Hungarian is a Uralic rather than an Indo-European language, this is likely a loanword. Further afield, in ancient Iran, a fortified wooden settlement was called a gerd, or certa, which also means garden (as in the suffix -certa in the names of various ancient Iranian cities; e.g., Hunoracerta). The Persian word evolved into jerd under later Arab influence. Burugerd or Borujerd is a city in the west of Iran. The Indian suffix -garh, meaning a fort in Hindi, Urdu, Sanskrit, and other Indo-Iranian languages, appears in many Indian place names. Given that both Slavic and Indo-Iranian are sub-branches of Indo-European and that there are numerous similarities between Slavic and Sanskrit vocabulary, it is plausible that garh and gord are related. However, this is strongly contradicted by the phoneme /g/ in Indo-Iranian, which cannot be a reflex of the Indo-European palatovelar /*ǵ/.

Construction 

A typical gord was a group of wooden houses built either in rows or in circles, surrounded by one or more rings of walls made of earth and wood, a palisade, and/or moats. Some gords were ring-shaped, with a round, oval, or occasionally polygonal fence or wall surrounding a hollow. Others, built on a natural hill or a man-made mound, were cone-shaped. Those with a natural defense on one side, such as a river or lake, were usually horseshoe-shaped. Most gords were built in densely populated areas on sites that offered particular natural advantages.

As Slavic tribes united to form states, gords were also built for defensive purposes in less-populated border areas. Gords in which rulers resided or that lay on trade routes quickly expanded. Near the gord, or below it in elevation, there formed small communities of servants, merchants, artisans, and others who served the higher-ranked inhabitants of the gord. Each such community was known as a suburbium. Its residents could shelter within the walls of the gord in the event of danger. Eventually the suburbium acquired its own fence or wall. In the High Middle Ages, the gord usually evolved into a castle, citadel or kremlin, and the suburbium into a town.

Some gords did not stand the test of time and were abandoned or destroyed, gradually turning into more or less discernible mounds or rings of earth (Russian gorodishche, Polish gród or grodzisko, Ukrainian horodyshche, Slovak hradisko, Czech hradiště, German Hradisch, Hungarian hradis and Serbian gradiška/градишка). Notable archeological sites include Groß Raden in Germany and Biskupin in Poland.

Important gords in Central and Eastern Europe

Poland 
 Bnin
 Cherven grods
 Gdańsk
 Giecz
 Gniezno
 Grudziądz
 Grzybowo
 Kałdus
 Kołobrzeg
 Kraków
 Ostrów Lednici
 Poznań
 Przemyśl
 Rozprze
 Stradów
 Szczecin
 Szprotawa
 Włocławek
 Wolin
 Wrocław

Czech Republic 
 Bílina
 Budeč
 Chotěbuz
 Kouřim
 Levý Hradec
 Libice nad Cidlinou
 Libušín
 Mikulčice-Valy
 Prague Castle
 
 Stará Boleslav
 
 Tetín
 Uherské Hradiště
 Vyšehrad (Prague)

Slovakia 
 Ducové

Ukraine 
 Kyiv

Russia  
 Novgorod

Belarus 
 Grodno

Germany

Rügen 
 the fort at Cape Arkona – the Jaromarsburg
 Garz Castle
 the fort of Charenza near Venz in the municipality of Trent
 the Herthaburg near the Stubbenkammer in the Jasmund National Park

Mecklenburg-Western Pomerania 
 Mecklenburg Castle in the village of Dorf Mecklenburg near Wismar (origin of the state name)
 the fort of Groß Raden near Sternberg
 the fort of Behren-Lübchin, partly reconstructed in the Groß Raden Archaeological Open Air Museum
 Gädebehn Castle (Gemeinde Knorrendorf) in the county of Mecklenburgische Seenplatte
 Ganschendorf Castle (Gemeinde Sarow) in the county of Mecklenburgische Seenplatte
 the fort of Grapenwerder (Gemeinde Penzlin) in the county of Mecklenburgische Seenplatte
 Quadenschönfeld Castle in the county of Mecklenburgische Seenplatte
 Neu Nieköhr Castle (Gemeinde Behren-Lübchin) in the county of Rostock
 the fort of Neu-Kentzlin (Gemeinde Kentzlin) between Demmin und Stavenhagen
 Mölln Castle (Gemeinde Mölln (Mecklenburg)) in the county of Mecklenburgische Seenplatte
 Möllenhagen Castle (Gemeinde Möllenhagen) in the county of Mecklenburgische Seenplatte
 the Ravensburg (Neubrandenburg)
 the forts at Kastorfer See near Neubrandenburg
 the island fort in the Teterower See
 the Schlossberg near Feldberg
 the Slavic fort near Menkendorf, a village in the parish of Grebs-Niendorf
 Wittenborn Castle ( municipality of Galenbeck) in the county of Mecklenburgische Seenplatte
 Kieve Castle in the county of Mecklenburgische Seenplatte
 Wulfsahl Castle in the county of Ludwigslust-Parchim

Berlin-Brandenburg 
 Brandenburg Castle
 Spandau Castle (Berlin)
 the Römerschanze near Potsdam
 the Reitweiner Wallberge, fortanlage near Reitwein in the Landkreis Märkisch-Oderland
 the Slavic fort of Lübben
 the Slavic fort of Raddusch near Vetschau/Spreewald
 the Slavic fort of Tornow
 Lossow Castle, Frankfurt (Oder)
 the fort near Kliestow

Saxony-Anhalt 
 the fort of Altes Dorf in the Magdeburg subdistrict of Pechau
 Wust Castle

Schleswig-Holstein 
  including:
 the fort of the Slavic settlement of Starigard in present-day Oldenburg –

Bavaria 
 Rauher Kulm

Austria  
Thunau am Kamp

See also 
 Oppidum, a type of similar but often much bigger fortified wooden settlement used by ancient Celts and Germanics.
 Gordoservon in Asia Minor, 680 AD
 Garðaríki – Varangian name for Kievan Rus, interpreted as "cities"
 Biskupin, a life-size reconstruction of a gord-like Lusatian culture settlement in Poland.
 Kraal (South Africa);
 Motte-and-bailey (Western Europe).
 Burgh, Borough, Burg or bjerg (Scotland, England, Germany, Denmark)
 Ringfort (Ireland, Britain, Scandinavia)

References

External links 
 Reconstruction of a gród at Grzybowo, Poland – images of a typical ancient Slavic settlement with suburbium, earth-and-wood wall and moat; by Tomek Birezowski (Polish text)

Fortifications by type
Early Slavic archaeology
Archaeology of Poland
Human habitats